The Northern Territory Minister for Children is a Minister of the Crown in the Government of the Northern Territory.

The current minister is Nicole Manison (Labor). She was sworn in on 12 September 2016 following the Labor victory at the 2016 election. It is an entirely new position concerned with "whole of government children's policy", while specific areas of child-related policy lie with the Minister for Territory Families.

List of Ministers for Children

References

Northern Territory-related lists
Ministers of the Northern Territory government